The International Speech Communication Association (ISCA) is a non-profit organization and one of the two main professional associations for speech communication science and technology, the other association being the IEEE Signal Processing Society.

Purpose of the association
The purpose is to promote the study and application of automatic speech processing (in the two directions: speech recognition and speech synthesis) with several sub-topics like speaker recognition or speech compression. The activity of the association concerns all aspects of speech processing, from the computational aspects to the linguistic aspects as well as the theorical aspects.

Conferences
ISCA organizes yearly the INTERSPEECH conference.

Most recent INTERSPEECH:
 2013 Lyon
 2014 Singapore
 2015 Dresden
 2016 San Francisco
 2017 Stockholm
 2018 Hyderabad
 2019 Graz
 2020 Shanghai (fully virtual)
 2021 Brno (hybrid)

Forthcoming INTERSPEECH:
 2022 Incheon
 2023 Dublin
 2024 Jerusalem

ISCA board
Current ISCA president is Sebastian Möller,
Vice president is Odette Scharenborg and other members are professionals of the field.

History of ISCA
ISCA is the result of the merge of ESCA (European Speech Communication Association created in 1987 in Europe) and PC-ICSLP (Permanent Council of the organization of International Conference on Spoken Language Processing created in 1986 in Japan). The first ISCA event was held in 2000 in Beijing, China.

See also
Natural language processing
Speech technology

References

External links 
 ISCA web page

Linguistics organizations
Applied linguistics